Chioma Ajunwa-Opara, MON, OLY (born 25 December 1970) – also known as Chioma Ajunwa – is a Nigerian former track and field athlete and football player, notable for becoming the first Nigerian to win gold at the 1996 Summer Olympics in Atlanta, and the first black African woman to win an Olympic gold medal in a field event. A member of the Nigerian Police Force, Ajunwa remains only woman to compete at both the FIFA Women's World Cup as a footballer and the Olympics as a track and field athlete.

In December 2017, Ajunwa launched the Chioma Ajunwa-Okpara Foundation to discover new Nigerian stars in sports. The Foundation, in collaboration with the Abia State government, sponsored an Under-16 Athletics Championship for Secondary Schools in March 2018.

Early life
Born into what she describes as "a very poor home", Ahiazu-Mbaise-native Ajunwa was the last of nine children, with six brothers and two sisters. Her father died while she was still young, leaving his wife to solely support a large family. At 18, Ajunwa, who had been a keen athletics participant during her school years, gained admission into university but was unable to register due to her mother's inability to pay the fees, and opted to become a motor mechanic instead, but abandoned the idea following her mother's disapproval.

Football
As a professional sportswoman, Ajunwa originally played football for the Nigerian women's team and was a member of The Falcons during the Women's World Cup in 1991, but as she was constantly benched, her skill was seldom used. Of her short-lived football career Ajunwa has stated "I've not regretted the decision [to leave football] because I've made my mark in athletics. I could have continued with football but there was a particular coach. He knew then that I was the best player in the team but he decided to keep me on the bench throughout every match so I left the team's camp. She played as an attacker.

Track and Field
Ajunwa performed as a track and field athlete and specialised in the 100m, 200m and long jump. She competed at the 1990 Commonwealth Games, winning a bronze medal in the 4 x 100 metres relay, and competed at the African Championships in 1989 and the All Africa Games in 1991 where she won gold medals in the long jump. Ajunwa was banned from the sport for four years after failing a drug test in 1992 despite maintaining her innocence.
 
Following the completion of her suspension, Ajunwa went on to become the first West-African woman, as well as the first Nigerian, to win an Olympic gold medal in a track and field event when she emerged victorious in the women's long jump event at the 1996 Olympics in Atlanta, with a jump length of 7.12 meters (on her first attempt) during the final. In 2003, she stated in an interview with The Vanguard "I toiled so much for this country, but then I was dumped...That I could be the only individual gold medal winner for Nigeria in over half- a-century of participation in the Olympics and I could still be treated like a scourge, I couldn't believe it."

Recognition

Member of the Order of Niger
Following her Olympic gold medal at Atlanta '96, Ajunwa was given a national award –  Member of the Order of Niger (MON) – by the then Head of State of Nigeria Sani Abacha, but complained that she was overlooked compared to the Nigerian football team claiming "I was given the MON award, right, but without 'E-Y.' When I heard of what was given to my brothers in the Super Eagles for winning the Nations Cup, I was amazed because you can see the difference...I'm not envious of anybody but this is the time to express my feelings that I deserve more."

Community Chieftaincy Title
Imo State awarded her a chieftaincy title.

Nigeria Golden Jubilee Independence Awards
On 1 October 2010, Nigeria celebrated its 50th Independence anniversary. As part of that celebration, on Thursday 30 September 2010, President Goodluck Jonathan conferred special Golden Jubilee Independence Awards on 50 distinguished Nigerians and friends of Nigeria including Ajunwa for their contributions to the development of the country.

Appointments and membership of bodies
Chairperson of the Women's Development Committee of Imo State Football Association. 2011
Member of Committee on the Revival of the Nigeria Academicals Sports Competitions. 2011
Assistant Commissioner of Police. 2018 - Date

Anti-doping campaign
On Friday 30 April 2010 Ajunwa delivered a paper on "War against the use of illicit Drugs in Spor" at an Interactive Session organised by Athletics Federation of Nigeria (AFN)
In the second half of 2010, Ajunwa stepped up her anti-doping activities by starting an integrated campaign aptly tagged 'Compete Fair & Clean'. This personally-financed initiative involves communicating messages directly to athletes and coaches at athletic events. Awareness and Red-flag workshops and seminars are being organised with the Athletics Federation of Nigeria (AFN). Ganners are placed at athletic events and informative publications as well as T-shirts with anti-doping messages are given to athletes and coaches.

See also
List of champions of Africa of athletics
List of sportspeople sanctioned for doping offences

References

External links

1970 births
Living people
Nigerian female long jumpers
Athletes (track and field) at the 1990 Commonwealth Games
Athletes (track and field) at the 1996 Summer Olympics
Olympic athletes of Nigeria
Olympic gold medalists for Nigeria
Nigerian sportspeople in doping cases
Doping cases in athletics
Nigerian women's footballers
Nigeria women's international footballers
1991 FIFA Women's World Cup players
Commonwealth Games medallists in athletics
Members of the Order of the Niger
Medalists at the 1996 Summer Olympics
Olympic gold medalists in athletics (track and field)
Commonwealth Games bronze medallists for Nigeria
Women's association football forwards
Rivers Angels F.C. players
African Games gold medalists for Nigeria
African Games medalists in athletics (track and field)
World Athletics Championships athletes for Nigeria
History of women in Nigeria
Nigerian police officers
20th-century Nigerian women
21st-century Nigerian women
Athletes (track and field) at the 1991 All-Africa Games
Medallists at the 1990 Commonwealth Games